Myrcianthes pungens, the guabiyu, is a species of plant in the family Myrtaceae. It is native to Brazil and Uruguay.

Description
Myrcianthes pungens is a medium sized tree, up to 10 m high, with a not very compact cup, with a lot of pubescent branches. The leaves are alternate, petiole, stiff, oval oblong, obtuse and acuminate, 4–7 cm, with a strong green color on the outside and lighter on the underside. It has rough bark of light brown color with abundant removable scales of the bark. Internally the bark has a whitish color, and when cut, emits a soft aroma. The flowers are tiny, whitish, abundant and aromatic.

It presents small, globose fruits, 1 cm in diameter, dark purple when they reach maturity, with sweet and edible pulp and a large seed. It blooms from September to October and bears from November to January. It is found in the Paraguayan departments of Guaira and Caaguazú and in the Cordillera department.

Distribution
It is cultivated as an ornamental plant in parks and gardens, being able as a shrub for colorful fences. The leaves can be used scattered on the ground in areas where flies abound, since when crushed they release a resin that drives them away.

See also
Myrcianthes coquimbensis
Myrcianthes rhopaloides

References

Flora of Brazil
Flora of Uruguay
pungens
Endangered plants
Taxonomy articles created by Polbot